The 1st Richmond Trophy was a non-championship Formula One motor race held at Goodwood Circuit on 18 April 1949. The race was held over 10 laps and was won by Reg Parnell in a Maserati 4CLT/48. Parnell also set fastest lap. ERA drivers Peter Whitehead and Cuth Harrison were second and third.

Classification

Race

References

Richmond Trophy